Caloptilia nondeterminata is a moth of the family Gracillariidae. It has been recorded in Oregon and Washington in the United States.

The larvae feed on Ribes species. They mine the leaves of their host plant. The mine has the form of a squarish mine on the underside of the leaf. It is slightly wrinkled and all parenchyma is eaten.

References

External links
mothphotographersgroup

nondeterminata
Moths of North America
Moths described in 1939